The Darmstadt tram network is a light rail system and the backbone of public transport within Darmstadt, a city in the federal state of Hesse, Germany. As of 2014, nine lines on four main routes serve 162 stops, including 92 low-floor stops.

History
Trams have operated continuously in Darmstadt since 1886, with the opening of a steam tram line. The network has been operated since 1912 by Hessische Eisenbahn-Aktiengesellschaft (HEAG) either directly, or, more recently, through one of its subsidiaries. Since then the trams have become a distinctive part of Darmstadt's character and are widely used by people from all walks of life as a safe and fast means of transportation within Darmstadt and its suburbs. At the Hauptbahnhof station (HBF) the tram system and the Rhine-Main S-Bahn meet. While some older lines like the Oberwaldhaus-/Martinsviertel-/and Ostbahnhof lines were closed, new sections were built, following the development of new residential areas, e.g. the new lines to Kranichstein, Arheilgen north and Alsbach south. Since the 1990s the tram system has gradually been modernised. All lines (except for line 3) have since been less of a classical tram system and more of a light rail system (Stadtbahn) with a private right-of-way and separate stations with "same-level-platforms".

Lines 
The central hub of the Darmstadt tram network is the "Luisenplatz", at which eight of Darmstadt's nine tram lines stop. On the main routes the hours of operation are usually from around 5:00 am until 1:00 am. The network is currently made up of the following lines:

All lines run – unless otherwise stated – at 15-minute intervals (at night and on Sunday mornings at 30-minute intervals). On the southern route between Eberstadt and Alsbach, service intervals are 15 minutes during peak hours and 30 minutes in the evenings. Since many stations are being served by more than one line, service intervals are 3 to 7 minutes at the central stations, especially in the city centre.

Rolling stock
The fleet consists of 48 trams and 30 trailers. 14 new Stadler-built low-floor trams are scheduled to enter service in 2022. A follow-on order for a further 11 trams was announced in June 2021. The five-section unidirectional Stadler ST15 trams are due to enter service between mid-2023 and mid-2024, allowing the ST12 vehicles to be withdrawn.

See also
List of town tramway systems in Germany
Trams in Germany

Bibliography 
Bürnheim, Hermann; Burmeister, Jürgen (1997). Bahnen und Busse rund um den langen Ludwig. (Engl.: Railways and Buses around the long Ludwig) (4th ed.). Düsseldorf: Alba Publikation. . (German)

Schwandl, Robert (2012). Schwandl's Tram Atlas Deutschland (3rd ed.). Berlin: Robert Schwandl Verlag. .

References

External links

 HEAG mobilo – official website
 
 

Darmstadt
Darmstadt
Transport in Hesse
Metre gauge railways in Germany